Iltovirus is a genus of viruses in the order Herpesvirales, in the family Herpesviridae, in the subfamily Alphaherpesvirinae. Birds, galliform birds, psittacine birds, chickens, turkeys, and quail serve as natural hosts. There are only two species in this genus. Diseases associated with this genus include: acute respiratory diseases: gaHV-1: infectious laryngotracheitis; psHV-1: Pacheco's disease.

Species
The genus consists of the following two species:

 Gallid alphaherpesvirus 1
 Psittacid alphaherpesvirus 1

Structure
Viruses in Iltovirus are enveloped, with icosahedral, spherical to pleomorphic, and round geometries, and T=16 symmetry. The diameter is around 120-200 nm. Genomes are linear and non-segmented, around 150kb in length.

Life cycle
Viral replication is nuclear, and is lysogenic. Entry into the host cell is achieved by attachment of the viral gB, gC, gD and gH proteins to host receptors, which mediates endocytosis. Replication follows the dsDNA bidirectional replication model. DNA-templated transcription, with some alternative splicing mechanism is the method of transcription. The virus exits the host cell by nuclear egress, and  budding. Birds, galliform birds, psittacine birds, chickens, turkeys, and quail serve as the natural host. Transmission routes are contact, contamination, and air borne particles.

References

External links

 Viralzone: Iltovirus
 ICTV

Virus genera
Alphaherpesvirinae